Philip Doyle (born 1 November 1964) is an Irish rugby union coach. He is the head coach of the Scotland women's national team.

Coaching career
Doyle first coached the women's national team from 2003 to 2006. He was reinstated as head coach in 2010 and led them to Grand Slam victory in the 2013 Women's Six Nations Championship.

Doyle also created history when the Irish women defeated the Black Ferns at the 2014 Women's Rugby World Cup in France. He resigned as head coach after the 2014 World Cup.

References

External links
IRFU Coach Profile

1964 births
Living people
Irish rugby union coaches
Ireland women's national rugby union team coaches